Grinnell may refer to:

Places 
United States
 Grinnell, Iowa
 Grinnell College, a liberal arts college in Grinnell, Iowa
 Grinnell, Kansas
 Grinnell Glacier, a glacier in Montana
 Grinnell Lake, a lake in Montana
 Mount Grinnell, a peak in Montana
Canada
 Grinnell Land, a section of Ellesmere Island in Nunavut
 Grinnell Peninsula, a peninsula on Devon Island in Nunavut
 Cape Grinnell, a cape on Devon Island in Nunavut at Griffin Inlet

Other uses 
Grinnell (surname)
Grinnell Mutual, an Iowa, US-based reinsurance company
Grinnell, Minturn & Co, a 19th-century American shipping company
Grinnell (automobile), an electric car made in Detroit, Michigan between 1910 and 1913.
Grinnell fish, otherwise known as a Bowfin
Grinnell Mechanical Products and SimplexGrinnell, subsidiaries of Tyco International

See also
 Greenhill (disambiguation)